Zavitinsky District  is an administrative and municipal district (raion), one of the twenty in Amur Oblast, Russia. Its administrative center is the town of Zavitinsk. Population:  20,198 (2002 Census);  The population of Zavitinsk accounts for 71.9% of the district's total population.

References

Notes

Sources

Districts of Amur Oblast